Stieglitz may refer to:

People
Stieglitz (surname)
Alexander von Stieglitz (1814–1884) was a Russian philanthropist and financier
Alfred Stieglitz (1864–1946), American photographer
Katherine Stieglitz (1898–1971), daughter of Emmeline and Alfred Stieglitz
Joseph E. Stiglitz (born 1943), American economist, recipient of a Nobel Prize in economics
Daniel Stieglitz (born 1980), German Artist, Director, Writer

Places
Stieglitz Museum of Applied Arts, museum in Saint Petersburg, Russia, founded by baron Alexander von Stieglitz
Stieglitz, Victoria, small hamlet in Brisbane Ranges National Park, Australia
Stieglitz, Tasmania, a locality in Australia

See also
Focke-Wulf Fw 44 Stieglitz, a German two-seat biplane
Steglitz, neighborhood and former borough of Berlin
Steiglitz (disambiguation)
Stiglitz (disambiguation)